The Duet technical routine competition of the synchronised swimming events at the 2015 World Aquatics Championships was held on 26 July 2015.

Results
The preliminary round was held at 09:00. The final was held at 17:30.

Green denotes finalists

References

Duet technical routine